San Pedro El Alto is a town and municipality in Oaxaca in south-western Mexico. The municipality covers an area of  km². 
It is part of the Pochutla District in the east of the Costa Region. 

El Alto Zapotec is spoken in the town.

References

Municipalities of Oaxaca